Robert J. Brown (June 15, 1935 – November 14, 2020) was an American educator and politician.

Early life and education 
Brown was born in Stillwater, Minnesota, and attended Stillwater Area Public Schools. He earned a Bachelor of Science degree in mathematics and speech from Winona State University, followed by a Master of Arts in educational administration and psychology and PhD from University of Minnesota.

Career 
Brown taught mathematics and physics at the Farmington Senior High, in Farmington, Minnesota, and at the Simley High School in Inver Grove Heights, Minnesota. He was a counselor and a track coach at both high schools. He then taught educational leadership at the University of St. Thomas. Brown served in the Minnesota Senate from 1967 to 1976 and was a Republican.

Personal life 
Brown died at his home in Roseville, Minnesota.

References

1935 births
2020 deaths
People from Stillwater, Minnesota
Winona State University alumni
University of Minnesota alumni
University of St. Thomas (Minnesota) faculty
Republican Party Minnesota state senators